New Hampshire Route 202A (NH 202A) is a  east–west state highway in Strafford and Rockingham counties in southeastern New Hampshire, serving as a northern loop of U.S. Route 202. Its western terminus is in Northwood at US 202 and New Hampshire Route 9, and its eastern terminus is in Rochester at New Hampshire Route 108 and New Hampshire Route 125.

Route description

Northwood and Strafford
NH 202A begins in Northwood as an offshoot of US 202 (overlapped with NH 9) and proceeds due north towards the town of Strafford. The highway runs into the center of town, intersecting and briefly overlapping NH 126 before turning eastward. NH 202A continues east, passing briefly through the northern corner of Barrington before crossing into the city of Rochester.

Rochester
NH 202A enters Rochester as Strafford Road, then turns east onto Crown Point Road before becoming Walnut Street. The road proceeds east into downtown, passing under the Spaulding Turnpike (US 202 / NH 16) without an interchange. The nearest interchanges to the turnpike are located at exits 13, 14 or 15. Walnut Street ends at a five-way intersection with Washington and North Main streets; NH 202A continues east onto North Main Street, which becomes one-way eastbound after crossing the Cocheco River and transitions onto South Main Street. Due to the counter-clockwise one-way flow of traffic in downtown Rochester, westbound NH 202A traffic transitions from South Main onto Wakefield Street, then must turn left onto Union Street and right onto North Main Street. The NH 202A designation continues for  before terminating at Columbus Avenue (NH 125). Traffic continuing on South Main Street transitions directly onto NH 108 southbound.

Major intersections

See also
 
 List of state highways in New Hampshire
 New Hampshire Historical Marker No. 191: Arched Bridge

References

External links

 New Hampshire State Route 202A on Flickr

202A
Transportation in Strafford County, New Hampshire
Transportation in Rockingham County, New Hampshire